Miri–Baram Highway, Federal Route 1-82, also known as Jalan Kuala Baram-Sungai Tujuh, is a major highway in Miri Division, Sarawak, Malaysia. This highway is part of the Pan Borneo Highway AH 150.

Main features
Batang Baram Bridge or ASEAN Bridge

Malaysian Federal Roads
Highways in Malaysia